Peko is a surname. Notable people with the surname include:

Domata Peko (born 1984), American football player
Ivan Peko (born 1990), Croatian football player
Kyle Peko (born 1993), American football player, cousin of Domata
Tupe Peko (born 1978), American football player